Flagstad is a surname. Notable people with the surname include:

Karen-Marie Flagstad (1904–1992), Norwegian opera singer
Kirsten Flagstad (1895–1962), Norwegian opera singer
Maja Flagstad (1871–1958), Norwegian pianist
Michael Flagstad (1869–1930), Norwegian musician and conductor
Mikkel Flagstad (1930–2005), Norwegian jazz musician